John Lord (10 September 1810 – 15 December 1894) was an American historian and lecturer.

Biography
Born at Portsmouth, New Hampshire, he graduated from Dartmouth in 1833 and then entered the Andover Theological Seminary, where in his second year he wrote a series of lectures on the Dark Ages, which he delivered the next fall during a tour through northern New York.  After graduating at Andover he became an agent for the American Peace Society.  Though not ordained to the ministry, he was called to a Congregational Church at New Marlboro, Massachusetts, and then to one at Stockbridge, Massachusetts.

In 1840 he gave up his pastoral duties to become a public lecturer and spend time on literary activities.  In 1843-46, he was in England giving lectures on the Middle Ages, and on his return to the United States continued to lecture for many years in the principal towns and cities, giving over 6,000 lectures in all. In 1864, he received his LL.D. from the University of the City of New York.  From 1866 to 1876, he was lecturer on history at Dartmouth College.

Works
Modern History for Schools (1850)
The Old Roman World (1867)
Ancient States and Empires (1869)
Life of Emma Willard (1873)
Points of History (1881)
Beacon Lights of History (14 volumes; 1883–96) This covers the old pagan civilisations through to modern Europe and America in his time.

Notes

References

External links 
 
 
 

1810 births
1894 deaths
American biographers
19th-century American historians
19th-century American male writers
Dartmouth College alumni
People from Stockbridge, Massachusetts
Writers from Portsmouth, New Hampshire
Lecturers
American male non-fiction writers